Cross Manor is a historic home located at St. Inigoes, St. Mary's County, Maryland, United States. It is a -story brick house with a side-hall double parlor plan and Greek Revival and Federal influenced woodwork. The house was constructed in three main stages with the earliest reportedly dating to before 1765. Other estimates date the house's origin to "before 1798", with further additions during the 19th century.

Cross Manor was listed on the National Register of Historic Places in 1988. News anchor Ted Koppel is the most recent owner of the house and estate and writes that the house dates to "at least 1765."

See also
List of the oldest buildings in Maryland

References

External links
, including photo from 1987, at Maryland Historical Trust

Houses on the National Register of Historic Places in Maryland
Houses in St. Mary's County, Maryland
Federal architecture in Maryland
Greek Revival houses in Maryland
Houses completed in 1789
Historic American Buildings Survey in Maryland
1789 establishments in Maryland
National Register of Historic Places in St. Mary's County, Maryland